Masy (also Массы Massy, between 1937 and 1991: Leninjol) is a large village in Jalal-Abad Region, Kyrgyzstan. Its population was 19,774 in 2021. It is the seat of the Masy ayyl aymagy (village community) and Nooken District. The Bishkek - Osh highway passing through Massy goes west to Kochkor-Ata and east to Bazar-Korgon and Jalal-Abad city.

Population

References
 

Populated places in Jalal-Abad Region